Hypecoum imberbe, the sicklefruit hypecoum, is a species of annual herb in the family Papaveraceae. Flowers are visited by Lycaena phlaeas (small copper).

Sources

References 

imberbe
Flora of Malta